Rudolf Zeiser (March 31, 1936-4 February 1993) was a German football player. He spent 7 seasons in the Bundesliga with TSV 1860 München.

Honours
 UEFA Cup Winners' Cup finalist: 1965.
 Bundesliga champion: 1966.
 Bundesliga runner-up: 1967.
 DFB-Pokal winner: 1964.

External links
 

1936 births
German footballers
TSV 1860 Munich players
Bundesliga players
1993 deaths
Association football midfielders